Jocelyne Rae Loewen (born 1976) is a Canadian actress working in Vancouver, Canada. She is known for her roles in the English dubs of anime series. She is best known as the voice of Yai Ayano in the Mega Man NT Warrior series, Mii from Popotan, Milfuelle Sakuraba from the Galaxy Angel series, Merle from Escaflowne and Penny Ling from Littlest Pet Shop.

In addition to voice work, Jocelyne has also played part in several live-action movies and television shows, including Stargate SG-1, The 4400, The Dead Zone, and Eureka.

Notable roles

References

External links
 
 Jocelyne Loewen at CrystalAcids

Canadian voice actresses
1976 births
Living people
20th-century Canadian actresses
21st-century Canadian actresses
Canadian film actresses
Canadian television actresses
Actresses from Alberta